Mads Krogsgaard Thomsen (born December 27, 1960) is a Danish businessman, CEO of the Novo Nordisk Foundation and former Executive Vice President of Research & Development, head of R&D and Chief Scientific Officer (CSO) at the pharmaceutical company Novo Nordisk. He was appointed senior vice president of Diabetes R&D in 1994 and in November 2000 he was appointed executive vice president and chief science officer.

Mads Krogsgaard Thomsen was employed by Novo Nordisk in 1991 as head of Growth Hormone Research and became Executive Vice President for Diabetes R&D in 1994. In November 2000 he was appointed executive vice president and Chief Scientific Officer (CSO). From 1994 to 2021 he was responsible for the research and development of 20 medical products especially within diabetes treatment and the groundbreaking development of GLP-1 and tablet technology used as replacement for conventional injection-based technology in biological diabetes treatment. Mads Krogsgaard Thomsen left the position as Senior Vice President o R&D on February 28 in 2021 for the position as CEO of the Novo Nordisk Foundation where he replaced Birgitte Nauntofte. He took over the role as CEO on March 1, 2021.

From 2017 to 2019, Thomsen was the chairman of the board of directors at University of Copenhagen.

Mads Krogsgaard Thomsen received the royal decoration of Knight of the Order of the Dannebrog by the Danish Royal House, 12 December 2022.

Education and background 
Mads Krogsgaard Thomsen went to boarding school in Epsom, Surrey in Great Britain from 1967 to 1971. He graduated from highschool from Rungsted Statsskole in 1979. He holds a master's degree from The Royal Veterinary and Agricultural University from 1986, now part of the University of Copenhagen. According to Krogsgaard Thomsen himself, he originally wanted to be a practicing veterinarian, and was inspired by the British television series All Creatures Great And Small. At the Royal Veterinary and Agricultural University, however, he started to take an interest in pursuing a career in either science or the pharmaceutical industry. He finished his PhD. from the same university in 1991.

Career 

 1982–1985 Instructor and assistant lecturer, University of Copenhagen
 1986–1987 Clinical Institute PhD stipend, University of Copenhagen
 1987–1988 Department of Pharmacology, PhD stipend, University of Copenhagen
 1988–1991 Pharmacologist at Leo Pharma
 1991–2000 Leadership positions at Novo Nordisk, from 1994 as Senior Vice President
 1991–1993 Head of Growth Hormone Pharmacology, Biopharmaceuticals Division, Novo Nordisk
 1993–1994 Director of Pharmacology, Diabetes Care Division, Novo Nordisk
 1994–1995 Senior Vice President of Diabetes Research & Development, Diabetes Care Division, Novo Nordisk
 1995–1998 Corporate Vice President of Drug Discovery, Novo Nordisk
 1998–2000 Corporate Vice President of Drug Discovery and Preclinical Development, Novo Nordisk
 2000–2021 Chief Scientific Officer and Executive Vice President of Research and Development, Novo Nordisk
 2000–Adjunct Professor of Pharmacology, University of Copenhagen
 2021–present: CEO, Novo Nordisk Foundation

Board positions 

 2000–2008 Board member, Technical University of Denmark (DTU)
 2000–2003 Board member, Akademiet for de Tekniske Videnskaber (2002–2004 chairman)
 2006–2012 Board member, Cellartis AB
 2012–2019 Board member, University of Copenhagen (2017–2020 chairman)
 2014–2016 chairman, Steno Diabetes Center
 2018–2019 Board member, Symphogen
 2020–present: Board member, BB Biotech

Private life 
Mads Krogsgaard Thomsen is married to Ulla. They reside in Denmark and he has three children.

References 

1960 births
Danish business executives
Living people